Michael Layer (born 23 October 1978) is a German former snowboarder. He competed in the men's snowboard cross event at the 2006 Winter Olympics.

References

External links
 

1978 births
Living people
German male snowboarders
Olympic snowboarders of Germany
Snowboarders at the 2006 Winter Olympics
Sportspeople from Heilbronn
21st-century German people